Benjamin Lessennes (born 29 June 1999) is a Belgian racing driver currently competing in the TCR International Series and TCR Benelux Touring Car Championship. Having previously competed in several karting championships.

Racing career
Lessennes began his career in 2010 in karting. He took several good results in many different karting championships. In 2011 he finished second in the Belgian KF5 championship standings. In 2013 he won both the French KF Junior and Belgian X30 Junior karting titles. In 2014 he won the IAME International Finale X30 Seniors title. In 2016 he made the switch to the TCR Benelux Touring Car Championship, he finished the season fifth in the standings after one victory and three podiums. With his teammate Renaud Kuppens taking four victories. He continued in the series again in 2017.

In April 2017 it was announced that he would race in the TCR International Series, driving a Honda Civic Type R TCR for Boutsen Ginion Racing.

Racing record

Career summary

Complete TCR International Series results
(key) (Races in bold indicate pole position) (Races in italics indicate fastest lap)

† Driver did not finish the race, but was classified as he completed over 90% of the race distance.

Complete World Touring Car Cup results
(key) (Races in bold indicate pole position) (Races in italics indicate fastest lap)

Complete GT World Challenge Europe Sprint Cup results
(key) (Races in bold indicate pole position) (Races in italics indicate fastest lap)

References

External links
 
 

1999 births
Sportspeople from Namur (city)
Living people
TCR International Series drivers
Belgian racing drivers
Karting World Championship drivers
World Touring Car Cup drivers
BMW M drivers
21st-century Belgian people
Boutsen Ginion Racing drivers
24H Series drivers
GT4 European Series drivers
TCR Europe Touring Car Series drivers